Ram Kishan Singhal is a leader of Bharatiya Janata Party and a former member of the Delhi Legislative Assembly. He was born in 1951 in Karnal in Haryana and has been member of  Municipal Corporation of Delhi.

References

1951 births
Living people
Delhi MLAs 2013–2015
People from Karnal
Bharatiya Janata Party politicians from Delhi
Date of birth missing (living people)